Fang Wu (born 23 March 1990) is a Taiwanese female singer-songwriter. Wu has participated in Super Idol and Duets China. She was once the member of the duo, BabyFace and Double 2 Band.

Career
In 2008, she formed a duo with Hsieh Guang Tai and participated in Super Idol Season 2, and got the fifth place. Later, she participated in Super Idol Season 4 and got the sixth place. She was recognized by her sweet voice. In 2011, she formed a band, Double 2, with Eli Hsieh, and released 2 singles which gained support from the netizens.

In 2014, she first performed at Taipei Arena due to her participation in the show, Super Slipper. In 2015, she participated in Duets China and joined team Jason Zhang, and got the third place. At the same year, she released her debut solo studio album,I'm Promising, where the lead single, "Accumulated Loneliness" received positive reviews from the general.

In December 2017, she released her second studio album, Pieces of Me.

In December 2021, her third studio album still alive had released. Different from previous works, this is her first self-released album after she left the label of Linfair Records.

Discography

Studio albums

Singles

Writing credits

Double 2 Band

Singles

Concerts/Tours

Precious Live Tour

Shows

Awards and nominations

The Association of Music Workers in Taiwan

Global Chinese Golden Chart Awards

HITO Music Awards

KKBOX Music Awards

MusicRadio Chinese Top Chart Music Awards

References

External links

 Fang Wu Facebook
 Double 2 Band Facebook
 Fang Wu Instagram
 Fang Wu StreetVoice
 Fang Wu Weibo
 Fang Wu Fansclub

1990 births
Taiwanese singer-songwriters
Living people
21st-century Taiwanese singers
21st-century Taiwanese women singers